Eduardo González Pálmer (23 August 1934 – 21 February 2022) was a Mexican footballer who played as a forward. He played the entirety of his career with Club América, leading the Primera División de México in 1959 with 25 goals.

In 1961, he appeared in four games for the Mexico national team, scoring a total of three goals.

González Pálmer died on 21 February 2022, at the age of 87.

References

External links
Club America profile

1934 births
2022 deaths
Mexican footballers
Association football forwards
Mexico international footballers
Club América footballers
Footballers from Michoacán